Montrose station may refer to:

Montrose station (CTA Blue Line), a rapid transit station in Chicago, Illinois, United States
Montrose station (CTA Brown Line), a rapid transit station in Chicago, Illinois, United States
Montrose station (Houston), a light rail station in Houston, Texas, United States
Montrose station (Metro-North), a commuter rail station in Montrose, New York, United States
Montrose Avenue (BMT Canarsie Line), a subway station in Brooklyn, New York, United States
Montrose railway station, in Montrose, Angus, Scotland
Montrose railway station (Caledonian Railway), a former station in Montrose, Angus, Scotland